The Fighting Dude is a 1925 American silent comedy film directed and written by Fatty Arbuckle as William Goodrich. Arbuckle worked for several years as a director and screenwriter under the pseudonym William Goodrich following his acquittal in 1922 of all charges in the rape and manslaughter of actress Virginia Rappe.

Plot
As described in a film magazine review, an  unathletic young man who is in love is ejected from a party at his sweetheart’s home by his rival. Thereupon he goes into training and challenges the rival to battle in a boxing match. In the fight in the ring the young man is badly beaten. He continues training and one day gives his rival a thorough thrashing after catching him on a golf course. However, while the two young men have been fighting, the young woman has found two more admirers. The new champion then decides that even he cannot whip the entire masculine half of the human race and gives up his pursuit of this young woman's affection.

Cast
 Lupino Lane as The Dude
 Virginia Vance as The Dude's Sweetheart
 Wallace Lupino as The Dude's Rival
 Glen Cavender as The Athletic Instructor
 George Davis as The Dude's Valet
 Dick Sutherland

See also
 List of American films of 1925
 Fatty Arbuckle filmography

References

External links

1925 films
1925 comedy films
1925 short films
Silent American comedy films
American silent short films
American black-and-white films
American comedy short films
Educational Pictures films
Films directed by Roscoe Arbuckle
Films with screenplays by Roscoe Arbuckle
1920s American films